Mîndrești is a commune in Teleneşti District, Moldova. It is composed of two villages, Codru and Mîndrești.

References

Communes of Telenești District